Robert of Capua may refer to:
Robert I of Capua (1106–1120)
Robert II of Capua (1127–1135)
Robert III of Capua (1155–1158)